Ortega is a town and municipality in the Tolima department of Colombia.

History 
In 1572, a group composed of captain Diego Bocanegra, Luis de Morales, Vicente Valenzuela, Ambrosio de Morales Bocanegra, and forty soldiers that Diego Bocanegra had taken to conquer the native Pijao, established a town named Santiago de la Frontera. That first foundation was abandoned, due to Diego Bocanegra leaving for the troops commanded by Gonzalo Jiménez de Quesada, following a high court's mandate. In 1586, Diego Bocanegra undertook a second foundation and named the settlement Medina de las Torres. Because of the attacks by the Pijao on Medina de las Torres, the town disappeared. A third foundation was also unsuccessful because of the attacks by the Pijao.

Panorama 

Municipalities of Tolima Department
1821 establishments in Gran Colombia